Abdi Abdikov (born 9 March 1983) is a Bulgarian football goalkeeper who currently plays for Bansko.

References

External links
 
 
 Sportal
 Video 1
 Video 2

1983 births
Living people
Bulgarian footballers
Bulgarian expatriate footballers
First Professional Football League (Bulgaria) players
Second Professional Football League (Bulgaria) players
PFC Pirin Gotse Delchev players
PFC Vidima-Rakovski Sevlievo players
PAEEK players
Othellos Athienou F.C. players
Karmiotissa FC players
Cypriot Second Division players
FC Septemvri Simitli players
FC Levski Karlovo players
FC Bansko players
FC Pirin Razlog players
Bulgarian expatriate sportspeople in Cyprus
Expatriate footballers in Cyprus
Association football goalkeepers